Cléber Eduardo Arado (11 October 1972 – 2 January 2021) was a Brazilian professional footballer who played as a forward.

Career
Cléber Arado started his career in América Futebol Clube (SP) in São Paulo, in 1992 he started his senior career. Then he played in Mogi Mirim Esporte Clube before the start of his international career.

Cléber Arado joined Japanese J1 League club Kyoto Purple Sanga in 1997. On 8 March, he debuted as forward against Avispa Fukuoka in J.League Cup. He also scored a goal in this match.

Next season he played for Brazilian club Coritiba Foot Ball Club, then in Spanish CP Mérida. In 1998 he returned to Brazil and played for several Brazilian clubs. He ended his professional career in 2006 in Rio Preto Esporte Clube.

Death
Cléber Arado died from COVID-19 in Curitiba at age 48 during the COVID-19 pandemic in Brazil, after having been hospitalized for 34 days.

References

External links

kyotosangadc

1972 births
2021 deaths
Brazilian footballers
Brazilian expatriate footballers
Expatriate footballers in Japan
J1 League players
Kyoto Sanga FC players
Association football forwards
Brazilian expatriate sportspeople in Japan
Deaths from the COVID-19 pandemic in Paraná (state)
People from São José do Rio Preto
Footballers from São Paulo (state)